Catawba is believed by most linguists to be one of two Eastern Siouan languages of the eastern US, which together with the Western Siouan languages formed the Siouan language family. Others believe it to be a language isolate.

The last native, fluent speaker of Catawba was Samuel Taylor Blue, who died in 1959. The Catawba people are now working to revitalize and preserve the Catawba language.

Phonology

Consonants 

There is also a [] sound, which happens to be an allophone of //. // rarely occurs.

Vowels 

{| class="wikitable" style=text-align:center
|+Short vowels
!
!Front
!Back
|- align="center"
!Close
|
|
|- align="center"
!Mid
| colspan="2" |
|- align="center"
!Open
| colspan="2" |
|}

{| class="wikitable" style="text-align:center"
|+Long vowels
!
!Front
!Back
|- align="center"
!Close
|
|
|- align="center"
!Mid
| colspan="2" |
|- align="center"
!Open
| colspan="2" |
|}

{| class="wikitable" style="text-align:center"
|+Nasalised vowels
!
!Front
!Back
|- align="center"
!Close
|
|
|- align="center"
!Mid
| colspan="2" |
|- align="center"
!Open
| colspan="2" |
|}

Short vowel sounds // can be unstressed, ranging to []. Back vowel sounds can range from // to [], and a short // can range to a back vowel sound [].

Errata
Red Thunder Cloud, an impostor, born Cromwell Ashbie Hawkins West, claimed to be Catawba and the last speaker of the Catawba language. He was promoted by anthropologist Frank Speck, who introduced West to the Catawba community. The Catawba told Speck that West was not Catawba, but Speck ignored them and continued to promote West and include him in his work, even recommending him as an expert to other anthropologists. (Speck is also the source of the theory that Catawba is a Siouan language; at one time he also insisted that the Cherokee language is Siouan.) At his death in 1996 it was revealed that West was neither Catawba nor even Native American, but had learned what he knew of the language from books, and from listening to the last known native speaker, Samuel Taylor Blue and his half-sister, Sally Gordon, when Speck brought him to the Catawba reservation. This had apparently been enough to fool the non-Native ethnologists who wrote about him.

References

External links 
Ives Goddard, 2000. "The Identity of Red Thunder Cloud", Smithsonian Institution, reprinted from Society for the Study of Indigenous Languages of the Americas Newsletter. (accessed 2021-05-25)
Catawba Texts

Catawban languages
Catawba